Religious Communities of the Name of Jesus may be:

 Knights of the Name of Jesus, also known as Seraphim, founded in 1334 by the Queens of Norway and Sweden to defend their respective countries from the onslaught of heathen hordes.
 Sisters of the Name of Jesus, six congregations of sisters founded in France during the nineteenth century in the Dioceses of Besançon.
 Confraternity of the Name of Jesus, formed by the amalgamation of the Portuguese Confraternity of the Most Holy Name of Jesus with the Spanish Confraternity of the Most Holy Name of God, established in the sixteenth century.